The 1974–75 I liga was the 49th season of the Polish Football Championship and the 41st season of the I liga, the top Polish professional league for association football clubs, since its establishment in 1927. The league was operated by the Polish Football Association (PZPN).

The defending champions were Ruch Chorzów, who won their 12th Polish title.

Competition modus
The season started on 17 August 1974 and concluded on 18 June 1975 (autumn-spring league). The season was played as a round-robin tournament. The team at the top of the standings won the league title. A total of 16 teams participated, 14 of which competed in the league during the 1973–74 season, while the remaining two were promoted from the 1973–74 II liga. Each team played a total of 30 matches, half at home and half away, two games against each other team. Teams received two points for a win and one point for a draw.

League table

Results

Top goalscorers

References

Bibliography

External links
 Poland – List of final tables at RSSSF 
 List of Polish football championships 
 History of the Polish League 
 List of Polish football championships 

Ekstraklasa seasons
1
Pol